Maria Fernanda Barbato Alves (born 17 April 1983), also known as Nanda Alves, is a retired Brazilian tennis player.

As of 1 March 2010, Alves was ranked world No. 262, and was the highest ranked Brazilian player. She enjoyed success on the ITF Circuit, winning 23 singles and 58 doubles titles. Alves made her WTA Tour debut at Copa Colsanitas in 2004, and played qualifications for all four Grand Slam events. Partnering with Vanessa Henke, she took part in the 2005 Australian Open doubles event, but they lost to Daniela Hantuchová and Martina Navratilova in the first round. After 2016 Brasil Tennis Cup, Alves retired from professional tennis.

Personal life
Alves was born on 17 April 1983 to Carlos José Alves and Maria Cristina Barbato Alves, who were both professional tennis players. She resides in her hometown Florianópolis, Santa Catarina. Alves began playing tennis aged four, along with her older sister Maria Cláudia. She cites Jennifer Capriati (of whom she said, "Capriati, because she played really well; she had problems with drugs and she escaped. I admire her determination to get out of that hole."), Roger Federer and Steffi Graf as her role models, and clay as her favourite surface.

Alves often works with kids in her father's tennis camp in Florida. Some of the players who practised in that camp are former world No. 1 player Gustavo Kuerten, Marcelo Melo, André Sá and others. She was coached by her father Carlos and former tennis professional Thomaz Koch.

Equipment
Alves played in Solfire gear and used Dunlop racket, model Aerogel 500 Tour.

ITF Circuit finals

Singles: 40 (23 titles, 17 runner-ups)

Doubles: 104 (58 titles, 46 runner-ups)

References

External links
 
 
 
 

1983 births
Brazilian female tennis players
Living people
Sportspeople from Florianópolis
20th-century Brazilian women
21st-century Brazilian women